The media in Africa is expanding rapidly due to advances in telecommunications, especially mobile phones and the internet.  In newspaper reporting, many Africans have won international media awards. In writing both prose and poetry, many awards have also been won by Africans, and Africa now claims a Nobel Laureate in Literature, Prof. Wole Soyinka of Nigeria.

History
In 1794 the first printing press arrived in Africa delivered to Freetown, Sierra Leone, but was destroyed by a French raiding party before it was ever used.  When another press arrived in 1800 the newspaper the Sierra Leone Advertiser began being printed.

Communications
Advances in satellite communication, and its availability in Africa (some countries on the continent have their own communications satellites) has meant that some local television stations are now viewed outside their terrestrial broadcast areas. Submarine fibre cables are gradually changing the face of communications in Africa and bringing faster and more reliable Internet connectivity to most countries on the continent. The challenge is to continue the advance of fibre inland. Much of the fibre being laid is without redundancy, so it is great when it works, but there is always the concern that you need satellite back up.

VSAT Providers covering Africa Onlime GmbH (www.onlime.com)

Digital media and internet
Digital media and internet are increasingly part of the African media landscape. Journalists across the continent are increasingly using the mobile phone as their primary reporting tool needed to collect text, photo and video. This content is often distributed via the internet and is an early example of convergence in the internet and mobile medium.

Pan African community based websites are also emerging on the scene and reflect trends in the Web 2.0 movement seen in other parts of the world.

Print media
Historically, Nigeria has boasted one of the most free and resilient newspaper presses of any African country, even under its past military dictatorships, most of whom have shown an intolerance of the press. In the rest of the continent, vibrant journalism is also getting to be the order of the day. As in more developed countries, many journalists, in a bid to uphold the integrity of the profession, have preferred to go to jail rather than betray the confidentiality of a source.

In 2005, journalists representing 23 African nations met in Cameroon and established the Society for the Development of Media in Africa (Société pour le Développement des Médias Africains, SDMA).

Literature

See also

Articles on the media of each African country appear with the title "Media of [name of country]", for example: Media of Nigeria, Media of Côte d'Ivoire, Media of Burkina Faso.
 Lists of newspapers of Africa
 List of radio stations in Africa
 List of television stations in Africa
 African Union of Broadcasting
 Internet in Africa

References

External links